Sayyid Mojtaba Mir-Lohi (9 October 1924 – 18 January 1956), more commonly known as Navvab Safavi, was an Iranian Shia cleric and founder of the Fada'iyan-e Islam group. He played a role in assassinations of Abdolhossein Hazhir, Haj Ali Razmara and Ahmad Kasravi. On 22 November 1955, after an unsuccessful attempt to assassinate Hosein Ala', Navvab Safavi and some of his followers were arrested. In January 1956, Safavi and three other members of Fada'iyan-e Islam were sentenced to death and executed.

Early life
Born in Khani Abad, South of Tehran into a well-known religious family on 9 October 1924, he received his primary education in Tehran and left school after eighth grade when his father died. His father, Seyyed Javad Mir-Lohi, was a cleric who was put in jail many years for having slapped Reza Shah's minister of justice, Ali Akbar Davar, in the face, and thus the young Navvab was raised by his maternal uncle, Seyyed Mahmood Navvab Safavi, whose name he eventually adopted. It was said that "the family name was changed to Navvab Safavi (deputies of the Safavids) to identify with the famous Shi'ite dynasty of the Safavids, who in the sixteenth century made Shi'ism the state religion of Iran." Seyed Mojtaba entered Hakim Nezami Primary School at the age of 7 and then continued his education at the German Industrial School. At the same time, he was studying religious lessons in one of the mosques in Khani Abad, and after Reza Shah abdicated and left the country, he turned to political activities. He staged a demonstration against the discovery of the hijab In the same school when he was not more than 18 years old, and it was his first struggle against the Pahlavi government.

Growing up during this period of militant secularization, after briefly (for few months) working in Abadan's petroleum installations in Khuzestan Province, for the British-owned Iranian Oil Company; a British oil company expert severely confronted one of the workers, after which Navvab called the workers to protest and carry out retaliation. The protests were suppressed with the intervention of police and military forces. Navvab also escaped and left Abadan for Basra and then Najaf by boat at night. He decided, to pursue religious studies at Najaf in 1943. Mojtaba stayed at the Ghavam School in Najaf and from the very first days began a friendship and close relationship with Allameh Amini, who had established a library in one of the upper rooms of the school and was writing his famous work, Al-Ghadir.

He learned jurisprudence, principles and interpretation from masters such as Abdolhossein Amini, Hossein Qomi and Agha Sheikh Mohammad Tehrani. He is said to have been known for his striking looks and his "mesmerizing" speaking ability, and compared his own charisma and magnetism over the masses to that of Hassan-i Sabbah, the leader of the Assassins.

Career
Safavi founded the Fada'iyan-e Islam organization in 1945, and began recruiting like-minded individuals. Like the Muslim Brotherhood, a group he was in deep connection with and even met Sayyid Qutb later in 1953. Navvab Safavi believed that Islamic society needed to be purified. To do this he organized carefully planned assassinations to rid Islam of "corrupting individuals," often prime ministers of Iran's government.

Amir Taheri claims that Safavi was "the man who introduced Ayatollah Khomeini to the Muslim Brotherhood and their ideas," who "spent long hours together" with Khomeini in discussion, and visited him in Qom on a number of occasions during 1943 and 1944.

He and his organization were responsible for the attempted and actual assassinations of politicians Abdolhossein Hazhir, Hossein Ala' (he survived the attempt), Prime Minister Haj Ali Razmara, and historian Ahmad Kasravi.

Safavi and his group were closely associated with Abol-Ghasem Kashani and supported but were not members of Mohammad Mosaddegh's National Front. Safavi worked with Kashani, helping organize bazaar strikes against Premier Ahmad Qavam, public meetings in support of Palestinian Arabs, and a violent demonstration in 1948 against Premier Abdolhossein Hazhir. When the Shah appointed National Front leader Mohammed Mossadegh to the post of prime minister, Safavi expected his objectives would be furthered. He demanded the government drive the British out, and that it release "with honour and respect" the assassin of Razmara. When that didn't happen, Safavi announced "we have broken away irrevocably from Kashani's National Front. They promised to set up an Islamic country according to the precepts of the Koran. Instead, they have imprisoned our brothers." He later warned, "there are others who must be pushed down the incline to hell", words which would pass on to Mossadegh and further alienate him.

Thus relations between Kashani and Safavi, not to mention Mosaddegh, became "strained."  On 10 May 1951, Navvab Safavi declared, "I invite Mosaddegh, other members of the National Front and Ayatollah Kashani, to an ethical trial.

Under the Pahlavi regime, the Usuli idea of democracy was suppressed and Shi'i Islamism found the space for revival. In 1950, at 26 years of age, he presented his idea of an Islamic State in a treatise, Barnameh-ye Inqalabi-ye Fada'ian-i Islam, which reflects his simplistic and naïve understanding of politics, history and society. After the 1953 coup against Iran's prime minister Muhammad Musaddiq, Navvab Safavi congratulated the Shah and said:

In the years to follow, he enjoyed a close association with the government. In 1954, he attended the Islamic Conference in Jordan and traveled to Egypt. There he learned about Hasan al-Banna, the founder of Muslim Brotherhood, who was killed by Egyptian government in 1949, and met Sayyid Qutb.  The Shia Marja, Ayatullah Hossein Borujerdi, rejected the ideas of Navvab Safavi and his radical group. He questioned him about the robberies that his organization committed on gun point, Safavi replied:

Navvab safavi didn't like Broujerdi's idea of Shia-Sunni rapprochement, he advocated Shia-Sunni unification under Islamist agenda. 
Fada'ian-e Islam launched a campaign of character assassination against the Marja and called for excommunication of Borujerdi and the defrocking of religious scholars who opposed Shi'i Islamism, a practice realized after establishment of the Islamic Republic of Iran for Ayatullah Mohammad Kazem Shariatmadari and other clerics through Special Clerical Court. Fada'ian-e Islam carried out assassinations of Abdolhossein Hazhir, Haj Ali Razmara and Ahmad Kasravi.

Arrest and execution

On 22 November 1955, after an unsuccessful attempt to assassinate Hosein Ala', Navvab Safavi was arrested and sentenced to death on 25 December 1955 under terrorism charges, along with three other comrades, by the same military court that ordered the execution of communists. The organization dispersed but after the death of Ayatullah Borujerdi, the Fada'ian-e Islam sympathizers found a new leader in Ayatullah Khomeini who appeared on political horizon through the June 1963 riots. In 1965, prime minister Hassan Ali Mansur was assassinated by the group.

Ideology
The main work detailing his vision of the world is Barnameh-ye Enqelabi-ye Fada'ian-e Eslam (The Revolutionary Programme of Fada'ian-e Eslam), "published in October/November 1950, in the heat of the debates over the nationalization of the oil industry", where he exposes a paradigm close to that of the utopian socialists like Saint-Simon, Charles Fourier or Robert Owen.

In philosophy and moral psychology, he proposed that "the human mind is the arena of a continual confrontation between the desires of the psyche (nafs) and the restraining force of reason ('aql)", and the latter should refrain the carnal desires of the former, like fornication or drinking alcohol.

In education, he favoured "compulsory elementary education for five years, and high school would train students in the areas of students' specialization. Only courses such as chemistry, physics, natural sciences, mathematics, and medicine, which are useful for society, would be taught" so "in this way those students who do not make it to college would have learned a trade when they complete high school", while he also promoted single-sex education, all of which would influence the educational policies of Ayatollah Khomeini.

In economy, he proposed a Third Position, refuting both western capitalism and communism for an Islamic vision, which is similar to Ayatollah Khomeini's anti-Soviet and anti-US position. His ideology has been characterized as "a Sismondian capitalism of shopkeepers and artisans where altruism, charity, and religious taxes (zakat and khoms) act as levelling devices in a society that would honour everyone equally and would provide for all their needs", "the shopkeepers and artisans would be living in a world of total harmony with the wealthy and fortunate merchants, while the corrupt and arrogant capitalist thieves and embezzlers of public funds would be done away with", whereas the government "would carry on certain responsibilities. It would maintain law and order and would make sure that Islamic codes of conduct are strictly enforced. It would educate the youth (public education by government is accepted) and carry out other social responsibilities."

In geopolitics, like many Iranian nationalists of his time, he's particularly critical of Great Britain and the Soviet Union, yet another feature Ayatollah Khomeini made his own. He was also strongly anti-Zionist, proclaiming that "the pure blood of the brave devotees of Islam is boiling to help the Moslem Palestinian brothers." In fact, apart from the obvious pan-Islamic tones of the movement, he was also somehow a nationalist in the sense that "the Fada'iyan's ideology combined religious zeal and belief in the supremacy of Shi'ite Islam with elements of Iranian nationalism. The Fada'iyan sought to 'purify the Persian language' and hoped to bring the Iranian-Shi'ite lands together and establish an Islamic government."

The main difference with the later founder of the Islamic Republic, though, and a radical one, is that he never advocated for a theocracy, as he accepts the monarchy, where "the Shah is viewed as the father of the family. He should be benevolent and fatherly in ruling the people. His faith and virtues should be such that people learn from him religious faith and virtues. He, as a father, should know how everyone is doing and that no one will go hungry or lack clothing. Then, 'as long as there is anyone alive in the family no one would dare to be disrespectful toward him, not to mention wanting to expel him from his home and family. Yes! The Shah must be a father, to be a father and the Shah.'".

Apart from Ayatollah Khomeini, Navvab's vision would influence many other important players of the Islamic Republic, for instance the scholar Morteza Motahhari, or being, with Jalal Al-e Ahmad and Ahmad Fardid, one of the main ideological pillars of the former conservative president of Iran, Mahmoud Ahmadinejad. The current Supreme Leader of Iran, Ali Khamenei, goes as far as saying "I have no doubt that it was Navab Safavi who first kindled the fire of revolutionary Islam in my heart."

See also

 Fada'iyan-e Islam

Further reading

References

 'Alí Rizā Awsatí (عليرضا اوسطى), Iran in the Past Three Centuries (Irān dar Se Qarn-e Goz̲ashteh - ايران در سه قرن گذشته), Volumes 1 and 2 (Paktāb Publishing - انتشارات پاکتاب, Tehran, Iran, 2003).  (Vol. 1),  (Vol. 2).
Mazandi, Yousof (United Press Iranian correspondent) and Edwin Muller, Government by Assassination, Reader's Digest, September 1951.

External links
Greatscholars News (About Navab Safvi)

Iranian Shia clerics
People executed for murder
People from Tehran
1924 births
1956 deaths
Iranian assassins
People executed by Pahlavi Iran
Executed Iranian people
People executed by Iran by firing squad
People convicted of murder by Iran
Iranian people convicted of murder
Fada'iyan-e Islam members